Sơn Tinh – Thủy Tinh (the Mountain God vs. Lord of the Waters)  is a famous Vietnamese myth. This myth explains the practice of tidal irrigation and devastating floods in Vietnam as a result of monsoon—a seasonal prevailing wind in the region of South and Southeast Asia, blowing from the southwest between May and September and bringing rain (the wet monsoon), or from the northeast between October and April (the dry monsoon).

Sơn Tinh is also one of the Four Immortals.

Myth 

Hùng Vương, the 18th king of the Hồng Bàng dynasty, had a very beautiful daughter named Mỵ Nương. When she grew up and became a woman, the King began his search to arrange her marriage. He wanted to find a special son-in-law, someone who was intelligent, handsome, and talented for his beloved daughter. To find such an individual, the King held an official contest. Anyone who could prove his worthiness, would be given the hand of his daughter. Princes, scholars, famous writers, gifted artists, wealthy businessmen, and men with various talents from everywhere came to try their best. Among them were two extraordinary men: Sơn Tinh, the Mountain God, and Thủy Tinh, Lord of the Waters.

King Hùng Vương requested both to showcase their powers. Sơn Tinh waved his hand in the air and trees instantly grew from the ground to make a forest. He just said a magic word and mountains rose from the earth. Thủy Tinh also had similar powers. When he waved his hand, the winds began to blow. When he spoke a magic word, the sea level elevated.

However, as both Sơn Tinh and Thủy Tinh met all the criteria required to become Mỵ Nương's husband, it was difficult to choose between them. Eventually, the King decided to present one final challenge. The first man to arrive with specially selected wedding gifts the next day would be granted permission to marry the princess. These unique wedding gifts included a nine-tusk elephant, a nine-spur cockerel, and a nine-mane horse. Early the next morning, as the sun came up, Sơn Tinh arrived first, married Mỵ Nương and took her back to the Tản Viên Mountain, where he lived.

Thủy Tinh came a few minutes afterward. Upon realizing that he was too late, he became extremely furious. He and his servants chased after Sơn Tinh to take Mỵ Nuong back. Unwilling to accept defeat, he summoned torrential rain, gusty winds, thunder and lightning, and also brought the sea level higher, to defeat Sơn Tinh. However, as the sea level rose, Sơn Tinh used his magic to raise the height of the mountains as a counter-measure. Everyone suffered the rage of Thủy Tinh as the floods he caused destroyed land, crops, and houses. To protect the people, their properties, and belongings, Son Tinh created dikes to shield from the rising sea.

This battle between the two Lords lasted for countless days but eventually, Thủy Tinh became weary and lowered the sea level. He never, however, forgave Sơn Tinh nor let go of his desire for revenge to get Mỵ Nương back. Thus, every year, people have to suffer floods as a consequence of Thủy Tinh's eternal vindictiveness.

Literature and music 
 The poem "Sơn Tinh, Thủy Tinh" by Nguyễn Nhược Pháp.
 The play Truyền thuyết Sơn Tinh Thủy Tinh (The myth of Sơn Tinh, Thủy Tinh) by Thanh Phương.
 The song "Chuyện tình Thủy Thần" (The God of the Water's love story) written by lead singer Trần Lập, performed by the Bức Tường band.

References

Vietnamese mythology
Vietnamese deities